Override clause is a proposed Israeli legislation which would give the Knesset the power to override the Basic Laws and the rulings of the Supreme Court. It is one of the key issues on the agenda of the 37th Israeli government. The law would give the Knesset the right to re-enact a law declared unconstitutional by the Supreme Court by a simple majority. Some of the versions of the law would also enable the Knesset to preemptively shield laws from judicial review.

The override clause was criticised for limiting the constitutional review powers of the Supreme Court and thus removing the checks and balances on the power of the majority, which would endanger the human rights and the rights of the minorities. According to the Israel Democracy Institute the Supreme Court has used its constitutional review power with restraint.

According to its supporters, the override clause would prevent the overreach by the Supreme Court. They say that in Israel, unlike other countries where constitutional review is practiced, the Supreme court judges are not appointed by the elected bodies and therefore the powers of the Supreme Court need to be limited.

Politics of Israel

See also
Parliamentary sovereignty
Section 33 of the Canadian Charter of Rights and Freedoms

References